Fruit rot disease may refer to:

 Phomopsis leaf caused in grapes by Phomopsis viticola;
 Kole-roga caused in coconut and betel nut by Phytophthora palmivora;
 Botrytis bunch rot caused by Botrytis cinerea primarily in grapes;
 Black mold caused by Aspergillus niger;
 Leaf spot, and others, caused by Alternaria alternata;
 Bitter rot caused by Glomerella cingulata;
 Cladosporium rot or Soft rot caused by Cladosporium cladosporioides;
 Kernel rot or Fusariosis on maize (corn) caused by Fusarium sporotrichioides;
 Sour rot caused by Geotrichum candidum;
 Penicillium rot or Blue-eye caused by Penicillium chrysogenum;
 Soft rot or Blue mold caused by Penicillium expansum;
 Brown rot caused by Monilinia fructicola;
 Strawberry fruit rot caused by Pestalotia longisetula